Nicholas Griffin is a Canadian-based philosopher. He is Director of the Bertrand Russell Centre at McMaster University, Hamilton, Ontario, where he holds a Canada Research Chair in Philosophy. Griffin's main area of research is Bertrand Russell. In reviewing Griffin's book Russell's Idealist Apprenticeship, Ray Monk comments that Griffin's account of Russell's early philosophical development 'is more detailed, more coherent, more plausible and ultimately more interesting' than some previous accounts, and that the book is 'one of the finest works of philosophical scholarship I have ever read'.

Books
Relative Identity (1977)
Russell's Idealist Apprenticeship (1991)
The Selected Letters of Bertrand Russell, Vol. 1, The Private Years 1884-1914 (editor) 1992
The Selected Letters of Bertrand Russell, Vol. 2: The Public Years 1914-1970 (editor) 2001
The Cambridge Companion to Bertrand Russell (editor) 2003
''Bertrand Russell.  A Pacifist at War: Letters and Writings 1914-1918 (editor) 2014

References

External links
 Video of Griffin describing research on Bertrand Russell at McMaster University

Year of birth missing (living people)
Living people
British philosophers